System is a family of proportional raster fonts distributed with Microsoft Windows. Sharing the same letterforms as Microsoft Sans Serif, the font family contains fonts encoded in several Windows code pages, with multiple resolutions of the font for each code page. Fonts of different code pages have different point sizes. Under DBCS Windows environment, specifying this font may also cause applications to use non-System fonts when displaying texts.

In Windows 2000 or later, changing script setting in some application's font dialogue (e.g.: Notepad, WordPad) causes the font to look completely different, even under same font size.  Similarly, changing language setting for Windows applications that do not support Unicode will alter the appearance of the font.

When Windows is running with low system resources, System is the fallback font used for displaying texts.

A string hidden in the .FON file (viewable with a hex editor or with a typeface editor such as Fony), reveals that this font was designed by Microsoft Corporation in 1988–1989, according to the copyright string hidden in the font file. Also, CGA, EGA and 8514/a versions of this font existed, also designed in the same period (1988-1989) by Microsoft Corporation. Also the 8514 variant remained in use on modern Windows versions as a high-DPI version of it.

Example
The following is the lorem ipsum as it appears here written in System.

See also
 Terminal
 Fixedsys
 MS Sans Serif

Sans-serif typefaces
Microsoft typefaces
Typefaces and fonts introduced in 1992